Camilla Hannon (born 21 July 1936) is a former Irish Fianna Fáil politician. She was nominated by the Taoiseach to Seanad Éireann in 1982.

References

1936 births
Living people
Fianna Fáil senators
Members of the 16th Seanad
20th-century women members of Seanad Éireann
Politicians from County Meath
Nominated members of Seanad Éireann